The 2018 World Junior Ice Hockey Championship Division II consisted of two tiered groups of six teams each: the fourth-tier Division II A and the fifth-tier Division II B. For each tier, the team which placed first was promoted to the next highest division, while the team which placed last was relegated to a lower division.

The tournaments were a round-robin tournament format, with two points allotted for a win, one additional point for a regulation win, and one point for an overtime or game winning shots loss.

To be eligible as a junior, a player couldn't be born earlier than 1998.

Division II A was held in Dumfries, United Kingdom, while Division II B was hosted in Belgrade, Serbia.

Division II A
The Division II A tournament was played in Dumfries, United Kingdom, from 10 to 16 December 2017.

As a result of the tournament, Japan was promoted to Division I B, and the Netherlands was relegated to Division II B.

Participants

Final standings

Results
All times are local (UTC).

Statistics

Top 10 scorers

GP = Games played; G = Goals; A = Assists; Pts = Points; +/− = Plus-minus; PIM = Penalties In Minutes
Source: IIHF

Goaltending leaders
(minimum 40% team's total ice time)

TOI = Time on ice (minutes:seconds); GA = Goals against; GAA = Goals against average; Sv% = Save percentage; SO = Shutouts
Source: IIHF

Awards

Best Players Selected by the Directorate
 Goaltender:  Kim Tae-kyung
 Defenceman:  Daiki Aoyama
 Forward:  Liam Kirk

Division II B
The Division II B tournament was played in Belgrade, Serbia, from 10 to 16 January 2018.

As a result of the tournament, Spain was promoted to Division II A, and Turkey was relegated to Division III.

Participants

Standings

Results
All times are local (UTC+1).

Statistics

Top 10 scorers

Goaltending leaders
(minimum 40% team's total ice time)

Awards

Best Players Selected by the Directorate
 Goaltender:  Raul Barbo
 Defenceman:  Luka Kramarić
 Forward:  Luka Vukičević

External links
IIHF.com

II
World Junior Ice Hockey Championships – Division II
International ice hockey competitions hosted by the United Kingdom
International ice hockey competitions hosted by Serbia
World Junior Ice Hockey Championships
World Junior Ice Hockey Championships
Sport in Dumfries
International sports competitions in Belgrade
IIHF
IIHF
2010s in Belgrade